The International Workshop on Balto-Slavic Accentology (abbreviated IWoBA) was an annual international conference on comparative and historical Balto-Slavic accentology, including the prehistory and history of the separate Baltic and Slavic languages, as well as synchronic and dialectal issues that have to do with accentology.  

The first conference was held in Zagreb 1–3 July 2005 with contributions by some of the world's foremost Balto-Slavists, Baltologists and Slavists, organized by the Croatian linguists Ranko Matasović and Mate Kapović. It proved to be an immense success and was thus followed by annually held IWoBA conferences, until the final conference in 2015.

Conferences

External links
 All available IWoBA proceedings in pdf on Miša Oslon's page
 Frederik Kortlandt's remarks to the contributions to IWoBA I (pdf)
 Mate Kapović's review of IWOBA I (pdf, in Croatian)
 Frederik Kortlandt's remarks to the contributions to IWoBA II (pdf)
 Frederik Kortlandt's remarks to the contributions to IWoBA III (pdf)
 Konstantin Bogatyrev's review of the Proceedings of IWoBA III (pdf)
 Miguel Villanueva Svensson's review of the Proceedings of IWoBA V (pdf)
 Proceedings of the 6th International Workshop on Balto-Slavic Accentology (Baltistica 2011, 7 priedas, all articles in pdf format)
 Proceedings of the 7th International Workshop on Balto-Slavic Accentology
 I.P.Kotoedov's review of IWoBA VII (pdf, in Russian)
 D.Tamulaitiene's review of IWoBA VIII (pdf, in Lithuanian)
 Interview with V.A.Dybo during IWOBA VIII in Novi Sad (in Serbo-Croatian)
 Proceedings of the 8th International Workshop on Balto-Slavic Accentology

Academic conferences
Balto-Slavic languages